Blockhaus may refer to :

 blockhouse, a small, isolated fort in the form of a single building to serve as a defensive strong point
 casemate, a fortified gun emplacement or armored structure from which guns are fired
 A peak of the Maiella massif in the Central Apennines in Italy